Simmons Lake may refer to:

Simmons Lake (Antarctica)
Simmons Lake (Washington)
Simmons Lake (British Columbia)